Jomfruland Lighthouse is a coastal lighthouse located on the island of Jomfruland in Kragerø, Norway. The original tower, made of bricks, was first lit in 1839. Another tower, made of iron, was built in 1939.

See also

Lighthouses in Norway
List of lighthouses in Norway

References

External links
 Norsk Fyrhistorisk Forening 
 

Lighthouses completed in 1839
Lighthouses completed in 1939
Lighthouses in Vestfold og Telemark
Listed lighthouses in Norway